Elachista baikalica is a moth of the family Elachistidae that is found in Russia (Irkutsk, Altai and the southern Ural Mountains).

References

baikalica
Moths described in 1992
Endemic fauna of Russia
Moths of Asia
Moths of Europe